The Children of Sanchez may refer to:

 The Children of Sanchez (book), 1961 book by American anthropologist Oscar Lewis
 The Children of Sanchez (film), 1979 American drama film based on the book
 Children of Sanchez (album), album by jazz artist Chuck Mangione, soundtrack for the film